Sundown, Queensland may refer to:

 Sundown, Queensland (Southern Downs Region), a locality on the Darling Downs
 Sundown, Queensland (Cassowary Coast Region), a locality on the north-east coast